dcache may refer to:
 the directory name lookup cache in Linux
 the dCache project